The Political Thought of Tarique Rahman: Empowerment of the Grassroots People is a book published by Bangladesh Policy Forum Cambridge, a non-profit policy organization based in Cambridge.

The book is a collection of seventeen articles written on the politics and thoughts of Tarique Rahman, the Senior Vice Chairman of Bangladesh's Bangladesh Nationalist Party, which had governed the country four times since independence. Authors of the articles, including four editors of the book, are Bangladeshi and English academics, journalists and politicians who have either the experience of working closely with Tarique Rahman or have come to familiarize with his activities through their own works.

The book was officially launched in June 2013 at the University of Cambridge. In August 2013, the American edition was published at Columbia University in New York City, followed by the Australian, Canadian and German editions which were respectively inaugurated at the University of New South Wales, University of Toronto and University of Ulm between September and October 2013.

Contents
The seventeen articles take place as individual chapters in the book.

 As I See the Policies of Tarique Rahman by David Nicholson
 The Legacy of Tarique Rahman's Family by Muhammad Jamiruddin Sircar
 As I See Tarique Rahman by Moudud Ahmed
 The Philosophy of Tarique Rahman by Mushfiqur Rahman
 The Future Leader of Bangladesh by Shaukat Mahmood
 The Endeared Leader of the People by M Maniruzzaman Miah
 A Leader Subjected to Inhuman Tortures by Anwarullah Chowdhury
 Bangladesh in the 21st Century: Tarique Rahman as the Saviour by Khandaker Mustahidur Rahman
 Safe Return: Save Bangladesh by Syed Rashidul Hasan
 Tarique Rahman: A Statesmanlike Leadership by Abdul Latif Masum
 A Cruel Victim of the ‘Goebbelsian Theory’ by Sahabul Huq
 Propaganda Never Prevails by Abdul Hye Sikder
 How I See Tarique Rahman as a Leader by James Smith
 The Bottom-Up Approach of Tarique Rahman: The Formula of Development by Saleh Shibly
 The Vanguard of the Nationalist Movement in Bangladesh by Humaiun Kobir
 How a Political Moderniser Rebuilds the Face of Bangladesh by Mahdi Amin
 The Road to Go by Ashik Islam

Publication
 Cambridge, Bangladesh Policy Forum Cambridge [2013]

References

2013 non-fiction books
Bangladesh Policy Forum Cambridge
Books about Bangladesh
English non-fiction books